Daphnus or Daphnous was a town of ancient Bithynia, situated upon an island in a lake called Daphnusis near the Mysian Olympus. The lake Daphnusis is identified as that called Miletopolitis by other authors.

Its site is located in Asiatic Turkey.

References

Populated places in Bithynia
Former populated places in Turkey
History of Bursa Province